The 1982 Paris–Roubaix was undertaken in very dry conditions, leaving the riders to battle dust clouds over the 270 km. Jan Raas of the Netherlands entered the velodrome at Roubaix to win alone. 

Below, the results for the 1982 edition of the Paris––Roubaix cycling classic.

Results

References

Paris–Roubaix
Paris-Roubaix
Paris-Roubaix
Paris-Roubaix
Paris-Roubaix